Home Alone 4: Taking Back the House is a 2002 American made-for-television Christmas family comedy film directed by Rod Daniel, which first aired on ABC on November 3, 2002, as the first episode of the forty-seventh season of The Wonderful World of Disney, followed by a DVD release on September 2, 2003. The fourth installment in the Home Alone franchise, the film stars Mike Weinberg, French Stewart, Missi Pyle, Jason Beghe, Erick Avari, Barbara Babcock, Joanna Going, and Clare Carey. It tells the story of Kevin McCallister who goes to spend his Christmas with his father and his new girlfriend as his old enemy Marv and his wife Vera come up with a plan to kidnap a visiting prince with help from an inside person that Kevin least suspects. This is the first film in the Home Alone franchise to not receive a theatrical release nor have any screenplay contribution from John Hughes.

Whereas Home Alone 3 featured a standalone plot and new characters, this film brings back several of the main characters from the first two films, including Kevin McCallister, but with all of the roles played by different actors. The plot revolves around Kevin McCallister trying to defend his future stepmother's house from his old nemesis Marv and his sidekick/wife Vera. It was the last film that Rod Daniel directed before his subsequent retirement (partly due to his diagnosis from Parkinson's disease, complications of which resulted in his death in 2016).

Plot
Peter McCallister, who is finalizing a divorce from his wife, Kate, announces to their children, Buzz, Megan, and Kevin that he and his wealthy girlfriend, Natalie Kalban, are hosting the visit of a royal family at her mansion, and invites them to spend Christmas there. After the three initially refuse, Kevin accepts the offer after being bullied by Buzz (who was supposed to be at the movies with his friends) and revels in the mansion's luxuries.

The next morning, Peter and Natalie go out while Kevin stays with Natalie's servants, Mr. Prescott the butler and Molly the maid. Kevin notices his old nemesis, Marv Murchins, and his wife, Vera, scouting the house. After failing to get Mr. Prescott's attention via the intercom, he drives them away by flooding the mansion. When Peter and Natalie return, they refuse to believe Kevin's explanation, especially since Mr. Prescott claims to have seen nothing. Kevin discovers that the security cameras were turned off during the break-in, leading him to believe that Mr. Prescott is in league with Marv and Vera. To cheer themselves up, Kevin, Peter, and Natalie decorate their Christmas tree, although it is later re-trimmed by professional decorators at Natalie's request.

As the mansion is prepared for a party for the royal family's arrival, Peter and Natalie go to pick them up, while Kevin notices Marv and Vera disguised as caterers. He traps Mr. Prescott in the freezer, overhears Marv and Vera's plan to kidnap the prince for ransom, and forces them out of a window. The royal family is unable to attend the party because their flight was canceled, so Peter and Natalie decide to announce their engagement instead. Marv and Vera run back into the house and pursue Kevin, who accidentally ruins the party by running into the guests and knocking over an ice sculpture that turns out to be a frozen Mr. Prescott. Angered, Peter sends Kevin to his room, refusing to believe his story and accusing him of trying to sabotage his relationship with Natalie, who threatens to evict him if he misbehaves again.

Taking matters into his own hands, Kevin sets up booby traps for Marv and Vera. The next morning, the duo head to the house after Peter and Natalie go to pick up the royals. Kevin tricks and locks Mr. Prescott in the basement, but eventually discovers Marv and Vera's real ally is Molly, who is also Marv's mother. Kevin gets locked in the basement with Mr. Prescott, who admits that he turned off the cameras during the initial break-in as he was taking an unscheduled break from his duties because he despises Natalie, let alone working for her; he and Kevin then apologize for misjudging each other. After several failed attempts to call Kate, Kevin escapes via the house's dumbwaiter and temporarily traps Marv underneath it. Marv and Vera pursue Kevin through the house, where they spring the traps and suffer various injuries, while Molly gets trapped in the house's elevator.

At the airport, Peter suspects that something is wrong back at the house with Kevin and takes a cab back to Natalie's to check on him. Kate, Buzz, and Megan also drive to the mansion due to the suspicious nature of the calls received by Kevin himself and Molly. Kevin uses an altered recording of Marv's voice to provoke an argument between him and Vera, and knocks them down a flight of stairs with a remote-controlled plane. The duo is then tricked by Kevin with a secret wall switch, ends up being launched onto a chandelier, and are knocked unconscious by their fall. Molly, having escaped, grabs Kevin, but is quickly knocked out by Mr. Prescott who also escaped via the dumbwaiter shaft and calls the police.

As Peter, Kate, Buzz, and Megan arrive, Kevin — with Buzz and Megan's help — prevents a final escape attempt from Marv and Vera. The royal family and Natalie arrive, and the offenders' plot to kidnap the prince is revealed to Natalie's shock. Mr. Prescott, per Kevin's advice, resigns from his position as her butler. Realizing that their relationship was built on infatuation rather than love and was affecting his responsibilities as a husband and father, Peter breaks up with Natalie, and reconciles with Kate and their children. Grateful to Kevin for his foiling of the kidnapping plot, the royals spend Christmas with the newly reunited McCallisters, devastating Natalie as Kevin and Prescott give the commands for music to play and snow to fall.

Cast
 Mike Weinberg as Kevin McCallister, a nine-year-old boy who defends the house from Marv and Vera. He was portrayed by Macaulay Culkin in the first two films.
 French Stewart as Marv Murchins, Vera's husband and an old nemesis of Kevin. He was portrayed by Daniel Stern in the first two films. His appearance and attire in Home Alone 4 more closely resemble that of his former partner Harry Lyme (Joe Pesci) in the first two films.
 Missi Pyle as Vera Murchins, Marv's wife and Molly's daughter-in-law whom he first met in prison. Her role replaces that of Marv's original partner Harry.
 Erick Avari as Mr. Prescott, the butler.
 Barbara Babcock as Molly Murchins, the maid and Marv's mother and Vera's mother-in-law where she serves as their inside person.
 Jason Beghe as Peter McCallister, Kevin, Buzz, and Megan's father. He was portrayed by John Heard in the first two films.
 Clare Carey as Kate McCallister, Kevin, Buzz, and Megan's mother. She was portrayed by Catherine O'Hara in the first two films.
 Joanna Going as Natalie Kalban, Peter's girlfriend.
 Gideon Jacobs as Buzz McCallister, Kevin's older brother. He was portrayed by Devin Ratray in the first two films.
 Chelsea Russo as Megan McCallister, Kevin's older sister. She was portrayed by Hillary Wolf in the first two films.
 Lisa King as Queen
 Craig Geldenhuys as The Crown Prince
 Andre Roothman as King

Production

Home Alone 4 was filmed in Cape Town, South Africa.

Daniel Stern, who previously portrayed Marv Murchins in the first two Home Alone films was approached to reprise his role, but declined after reading the original script.

Release 
The film premiered on television on November 3, 2002, and was released on DVD on September 2, 2003.

In November 2020, Disney began to feature the first three Home Alone films on their streaming service Disney+ in celebration of the first film's 30th anniversary. The fourth and fifth installments were released on HBO Max and were added to Disney+ on December 17, 2021.

Reception
Clint Morris at Moviehole gave the film one out of five stars, writing, "From the unappealing cheapish opening titles to the murky production values, it's immediately obvious Home Alone 4 isn't playing in the same park as its beloved predecessor... sad". Joly Herman of Common Sense Media also rated the film one out of five stars and wrote, "recycled gags with none of the original's charm". Jerry Roberts of Armchair Media gave the film one out of four stars. Sue Robinson of Radio Times gave the film one out of five stars, writing that, "you have to wonder why they bothered".

Sequels

On March 15, 2012, ABC Family announced that Home Alone: The Holiday Heist was in production, which premiered on that network during the 2012 Christmas season. The film stars Christian Martyn as the 10-year-old main character Finn Baxter. The story centers on the family's relocation from California to Maine, where Finn becomes convinced that his new house is haunted. When his parents become stranded across town and Finn is left home alone with his older sister Alexis, he sets traps to catch his new home's ghosts, which instead prove troublesome for a group of thieves (played by Malcolm McDowell, Debi Mazar, and Eddie Steeples). The film also starred Ed Asner, produced by Fox Television Studios, and directed by Peter Hewitt.

See also
 List of Christmas films
 List of television films produced for American Broadcasting Company

References

External links
 

2002 films
2003 films
2002 television films
2003 television films
2000s children's comedy films
American Christmas comedy films
20th Century Fox direct-to-video films
Christmas television films
Films directed by Rod Daniel
Films scored by Teddy Castellucci
Films set in Chicago
Films shot in South Africa
Home Alone (franchise)
Television sequel films
2000s Christmas comedy films
20th Century Fox Television films
2002 comedy films
2003 comedy films
2000s American films